"Lenny" is the tenth and final track on the first Stevie Ray Vaughan album Texas Flood. The song is in 4/4 time and notated in the key of E flat major (but instruments are tuned down a half-step, therefore, the chordal structure is in E). It is played very slowly and freely, with Vaughan alternating between jazz-inflected chords and solo runs. The main chord featured in the song is a movable Major 6th chord in which Vaughan applies moderate vibrato by use of tremolo bar. The solos incorporate both the E major scale, E minor Pentatonic scale, and E Minor Blues scale. The style is influenced by Jimi Hendrix ballads like "The Wind Cries Mary."  The song itself was written and named for his wife at the time, Lenora. Vaughan also named one of his guitars "Lenny," which he used to play this side and also "Riviera Paradise." The track was often played at live shows.

References 

Stevie Ray Vaughan songs
1980s instrumentals
1983 songs
Songs written by Stevie Ray Vaughan